F! was a Philippine weekly lifestyle magazine television program that aired on ABS-CBN from January 2, 1999, to February 26, 2006. It replaced Citiline and was replaced by Us Girls, becoming the longest-running lifestyle show on the network. The program focused on fashion trends, dining spots, and social life, and was originally hosted by actress Angel Aquino, interior designer and model Daphne Oseña-Paez, and journalist Cher Calvin. The trio became known as the F Girls. However, when Calvin left the show for the United States, supermodel Amanda Griffin joined the cast.

History

1999: F's Beginning; Citiline's Replacement
On January 2, 1999, lifestyle show Citiline, which was then hosted by Cory Quirino, had to move to the newly opened subsidiary of ABS-CBN which happened to be Studio 23. The management needed to fill the show's slot. That's when they formulated the show entitled F which focused on the life of a woman and lifestyle. It was planned to be hosted by Daphne Oseña-Paez, then working at the News and Current Affairs division, but ABS-CBN managed to add actress Angel Aquino and newcomer Cher Calvin to the hosts, where they became the trio called the F Girls.

2003–2006: Amanda is in; Cher is out
In January 2003, one of the original hosts of the show, Cher Calvin left the country to pursue a broadcasting career in the United States. That leaves Aquino and Osena-Paez as the original hosts. During the latter part of the year, the show welcomed supermodel Amanda Griffin as the replacement for Calvin.

2006: F's Farewell
The show didn't last long because ratings started to slide. F aired its last episode on February 26, 2006, due to this cause. The F girls decided to part ways after 7 years of working together, bringing Filipino viewers a different view in lifestyle programming. However, Aquino didn't leave the hosting of lifestyle show as she hosted Us Girls with actresses Cheska Garcia and Iya Villania joining her as the main hosts.

2007–2009: Life after F: Future Plans
After F ceased airing, the girls became successful in their careers. Angel Aquino became a successful actress and still continuing what she started at F as a lifestyle host. Cher Calvin became a journalist in the United States at KTLA-TV. Daphne Oseña-Paez started her own business by selling furniture, became the host of lifestyle show Urban Zone in ABS-CBN and Amanda Griffin still continues being a model.

2009: Olay TV Reunion of F Girls after a decade
In 2009, the F girls were reunited once again after 10 years of working together in F. They had interviews, photoshoots and even guest appearances on TV and radio. ABS-CBN executives decided that the original F girls would do a comeback special as they reminisce the days they had working again. The TV special was sponsored by Olay Total Effects Cream, which is also being advertised in the show. F's Reunion episode was premiered September 27, 2009, one day after the destruction done by Typhoon Ondoy (Ketsana).

Hosts
Angel Aquino (1999–2006; 2009)
Daphne Oseña-Paez (1999–2006; 2009)
Cher Calvin (1999–2003; 2009)
Amanda Griffin (2003–2006; 2009)

See also
List of programs broadcast by ABS-CBN
List of programs aired by Studio 23

References

1999 Philippine television series debuts
2006 Philippine television series endings
1990s Philippine television series
ABS-CBN original programming
Philippine television shows
English-language television shows